Mesnik may refer to:
William Mesnik (b. 1953), American actor
Mesnik, Iran, a village in Hamadan Province, Iran